The Miss Nicaragua 2014 pageant, was held on March 15, 2014 in Managua, after weeks of events.

The winner was Marline Barberena of Chinandega was crowned Miss Nicaragua 2014. She represented Nicaragua at Miss Universe 2014 in Doral, Florida but unplaced.  The rest of the finalists would enter different pageants.

Placements

Special awards

 Most Beautiful Face - Masaya - Katherine Guadamuz
 Miss Photogenic - Masaya - Katherine Guadamuz
 Miss Congeniality - Chontales - Linda Yamaki
 Best Smile - Masaya - Katherine Guadamuz
 Miss Fitness - Chinandega - Marline Barberena
 Miss Popularity - Matagalpa - Kiutza Merdina  (by Text votes of CLARO Telecom company)

Official Contestants

Trivia

 This makes it the first time in the pageant's history that a Miss Nicaragua is NOT crowned by her predecessor, because Nastassja Bolívar got dethroned a month before this pageant. The reason for this dethronement is that Nastassja didn’t agree to the modeling agreement that is part of the contract that competitors have to sign to compete. According to reports, Nastassja backed out before the Miss Universe 2013 but because they were so short on time, the Miss Nicaragua Orzanization let her represent them anyway on the competition in Russia. Now that the competition is over, they are taking the crown away.
 Marline Barberena was crowned by the hostess Valeria Sanchez instead of the 1st runner-up of 2013 or Mrs. Karen Celebertti, National Director of the Miss Nicaragua Orzanization creating widespread controversy.

Judges

 Luisa Amalia Urcuyo -  Miss Nicaragua 1993
 Shantall Lacayo - Fashion Designer
 María Gabriela Vega Gutiérrez - Regional Director of Zoom Communications, LLC
 Mauricio Solorzano - Operations Manager of Compañía Licorera de Nicaragua, S.A
 Dra. Paula Arce - Nutritionist
 Jorge Antonio Vega Umaña - Fashion Designer
 Sharon Amador - Miss Ámbar Mundial 2006

Background Music

Opening Show – Revuelta Sonora - "Morasucia"
Swimsuit Competition - Revuelta Sonora - "Catalunya"
Evening Gown Competition – Solartape - Goodbye

Special Guests

 Grupo de Danzas S.e.v.E.n  - Icona Pop - All Night

Contestant notes  
Marline Barberena, has dual citizenships American and Nicaraguan. 
Desireé Estrada, is of American descent.
Linda Yamaki, is of Japanese descent.

References

Miss Nicaragua
2014 in Nicaragua
2014 beauty pageants